Tarek Ghoul (born January 6, 1975 in El Harrach, Algiers Province) is a retired Algerian football player. He played for Algeria national team.

National team statistics

References

DZFoot Profile

1975 births
Living people
People from El Harrach
Algerian footballers
Algeria international footballers
USM Alger players
USM Blida players
USM El Harrach players
MC Oran players
MO Constantine players
1996 African Cup of Nations players
1998 African Cup of Nations players
Algeria under-23 international footballers
Competitors at the 1997 Mediterranean Games
Association football defenders
Mediterranean Games competitors for Algeria
21st-century Algerian people